The 34th Hong Kong Awards ceremony, honored the best films of 2014 and took place on 19 April 2015 at the Hong Kong Cultural Centre, Kowloon, Hong Kong. The ceremony was hosted by Jordan Chan, Gordon Lam, and Miriam Yeung, during the ceremony awards are presented in 19 categories and 1 Lifetime Achievement Award.

Awards
Winners are listed first, highlighted in boldface, and indicated with a double dagger.

References

External links
 Official website of the Hong Kong Film Awards
 Hong Kong Film Awards 2013 University of Hong Kong Library 

2013
2014 film awards
2015 in Hong Kong
Hong